Barbara Celarent may refer to:
The traditional names for two of the syllogisms of Aristotelian logic
A mnemonic poem by William of Sherwood listing the syllogisms
A pseudonym of Andrew Abbott, American sociologist
A character from Alexander Theroux' novel "Darconville's Cat"